Erb, ERB or ErB may refer to:

People
 Edgar Rice Burroughs (1875–1950), American author
 Erb of Gwent (–), king of Gwent and Glywysing

Surname
 Abraham Erb (1772–1830), American-born Canadian settler
 Albrecht Erb (1628–1714), Austrian clockmaker
 Charles F. Erb (1902–1952), American football player and coach
 Christopher Erb (born 1972), American marketer
 David Erb (1923-2019), retired jockey
 Dilman Kinsey Erb (1857–1936), Canadian politician
 Jacob Walter Erb (1909–1990), Canadian politician
 James Erb (1926–2014), American composer
 Jeffrey D. Erb (born 1969), American filmmaker
 Joseph L. Erb (born 1974), Native American filmmaker
 Karl Erb (1877–1958), German singer
 Lester Erb (born 1969), American football coach
 Mario Erb (born 1990), German footballer
 Summer Erb (born 1977), American basketball player
 Wilhelm Heinrich Erb (1840–1921), German neurologist

Biology and health
 Erb's palsy, a paralysis of the arm due to nerve damage
 Erb's point (disambiguation), which can refer to:
 The nerve point of neck
 A point between the third and fourth rib, in front of the heart (see Surface anatomy#Surface anatomy of the thorax)
 Limb-girdle muscular dystrophy, also called Erb's muscular dystrophy, or simply Erb's
 Estrogen receptor beta (ER-β), one of two main types of estrogen receptors

Technology
 Effective resolution bandwidth
 Equivalent rectangular bandwidth
 Erb, an implementation of eRuby

Organizations
 Edgar Rice Burroughs, Inc., an American media company
 Educational Records Bureau, an American educational testing organization
 Eel River Brewing Company, an American brewery
 Engineers Registration Board, in Uganda
 Erb Institute, an institute at the University of Michigan
 Ethical review board, or institutional review board, type of committee that applies research ethics
 European Radio for Belarus, an international radio station based in Warsaw

Other uses
 Epic Rap Battles of History, a YouTube video series
 Extended-range bass, a special type of electric bass guitar
 Eyes-on-the-Road-Benefit, a purported advantages of using a heads-up-display
 5621 Erb, a minor planet

See also
 Herb (disambiguation)